Yamanaka (lit: "middle of mountain") is a Japanese surname. Notable people with the surname include:

 Akira Joe Yamanaka, singer for the Flower Travellin' Band
 Akiko Yamanaka (born 1945), Japanese politician of the Liberal Democratic Party
 Chihiro Yamanaka, Japanese jazz pianist and composer
 Daichi Yamanaka (born 1990), Japanese speed-skater
 Hirofumi Yamanaka (born 1985), professional Japanese baseball player
 Hiroko Yamanaka (born 1978), retired Japanese female mixed martial arts fighter
 Lisa Yamanaka, Japanese Canadian actress and voice actress
 Lois-Ann Yamanaka (born 1961), Japanese American poet and novelist from Hawaii
 Miwako Yamanaka (born 1978), retired Japanese long-distance runner
, Japanese female table tennis player
 Norio Yamanaka (born 1928)
, Japanese diver
 Ryoji Yamanaka (born 1983), former Japanese football player
 Ryosuke Yamanaka (born 1993), Japanese football player
, Japanese footballer
 Ryuya Yamanaka (born 1995), Japanese boxer
 Sadajirō Yamanaka (1866-1936), Japanese art dealer
 Sadao Yamanaka (1909–1938), Japanese film director and screenwriter
 Sawao Yamanaka (born 1968), the frontman of the bands The Pillows
 Seiko Yamanaka (born 1989), Japanese football player
 Shino Yamanaka (born 1990), Japanese modern pentathlete
 Shinsuke Yamanaka (born 1982), Japanese professional boxer
 Shinya Yamanaka (born 1962), Japanese Nobel Prize-winning stem cell researcher
, Japanese ice hockey player
 Tsuyoshi Yamanaka (born 1939), Japanese olympic swimmer
 Yamanaka Yukimori (1545–1578), Japanese samurai of the Sengoku period

Fictional characters 
Ino Yamanaka, a character in the Naruto Anime and Manga
Inoichi Yamanaka, a character in the Naruto Anime and Manga
Sawako Yamanaka, a character in the K-ON! Anime and Manga

See also
 Yamanaka, Ishikawa, former town located in Enuma District
 Meiden-Yamanaka Station, train station located in Okazaki
 Lake Yamanaka, one of the Fuji Five Lakes in Japan
 Yamanaka factors, regulators in cell reprogramming. 

Japanese-language surnames